The 13th Light Brigade is one of the three combat brigades of the Royal Netherlands Army, the other ones being 11th Airmobile Brigade and 43rd Mechanised Brigade. The brigade is a fully motorised brigade, equipped with Fennek, Boxer and Bushmaster wheeled, armoured vehicles.

History
The brigade was formed as the 13th Motorized Brigade, and came from the 3rd Infantry Brigade. The 3rd Infantry Brigade was part of the First Division '7 December' which was formed on 1 September 1946. In 1950 the brigade was transformed into a mechanized infantry brigade, the 13th Mechanized brigade, which became part of the 4th Division and was stationed in North Germany. After the reforms of 1970 the brigade became again a part of the First Division. In the early 1990s the brigade became a fully mechanized brigade. In 2013, the brigade lost its mechanized infantry fighting vehicles and was equipped with wheeled equipment and therefore renamed 13th Light Brigade.

Organization

The 13th Light Brigade is made up by the following units:

  13 Light Brigade, in Oirschot
 13 Staff Company (13 Stafcompagnie), in Oirschot
 17 Armoured Infantry Battalion "Fuseliers Prinses Irene" (17 Pantserinfanteriebataljon Fuseliers Prinses Irene), in Oirschot
 A; B; C and D Company, with Boxer armoured fighting vehicles
 42 Armoured Infantry Battalion "Limburgse Jagers" (42 Pantserinfanteriebataljon Limburgse Jagers), in Oirschot
 A; B; C and D Company, with Boxer armoured fighting vehicles
 30 National Reserve Corps (NATRES) Battalion (30 Natresbataljon), in Vlissingen
 Alpha Company (Alfacompagnie), in Vlissingen
 Bravo Company (Bravocompagnie), in Breda
 Charlie Company (Charliecompagnie), in Oirschot
 Delta Company (Deltacompagnie), in Brunssum
 Echo Company (Echocompagnie), in Vredepeel
 41 Armoured Engineer Battalion (41 Pantsergeniebataljon), in Oirschot
 Staff Company, 411 and 412 Armored Engineer Company, 414 CBRN Defense Company
 42 Brigade Reconnaissance Squadron "Huzaren van Boreel" (42 Brigadeverkenningseskadron Huzaren van Boreel), in Oirschot, with Fennek light armoured reconnaissance vehicles
 13 Medical Company (13 Geneeskundige Compagnie), in Oirschot
 13 Maintenance Company (13 Herstelcompagnie), in Oirschot
 Robotics and Autonomous Systems Cell (Robotica en Autonome Systemen cel), in Oirschot

Equipment
 97 Fennek armoured reconnaissance vehicles
 117 Boxer armoured vehicle in various types. 
 30 Bushmaster infantry mobility vehicles in various types.
 72 Mercedes-Benz G280 CDI terrain vehicles.
 6 Milrem THeMIS unmanned ground vehicles.

References

Brigades of the Netherlands